Wang Huning (born 6 October 1955) is a Chinese political theorist and one of the top leaders of the Chinese Communist Party (CCP), who is currently the chairman of the Chinese People's Political Consultative Conference (CPPCC). He has been a leading  ideologist in the country since the 1990s. He has been a member of the CCP's Politburo Standing Committee, China's top decision-making body since 2017, and is its fourth-ranking member since 2022.

Widely regarded as the "Grey Eminence" of the CCP, Wang is believed to be the chief ideologue of the Communist Party and principal architect behind the official political ideologies of three CCP general secretaries since the 1990s. He has held significant influence over policy and decision-making of all three paramount leaders, an exceptionally rare feat in Chinese politics. Wang believes that a strong, centralized state is needed in China to resist foreign influence, an idea that has been influential under Xi Jinping.

A former academic, Wang was a professor of international politics and dean of the law school at Fudan University. During this time, he gained attention due to his belief in "neoconservatism", which held that a strong leadership was needed for China's stability and political reforms. He started to work for the CCP leadership in 1995 as a director of a research team at the CCP's Central Policy Research Office (CPRO). He became the CPRO's deputy director in 1998, and was promoted to the party's Central Committee and director of the office in 2002, remaining the latter until 2020, the longest tenure in the office. He assisted CCP general secretary Jiang Zemin, and was believed to be instrumental in developing Jiang's signature political theory, the Three Represents. He later became a close confidant of CCP general secretary Hu Jintao, believed to be key to developing his primary theory, Scientific Outlook on Development, and became a secretary of the CCP secretariat in 2007.

Wang became a member of the CCP Politburo in 2012, and is believed to have developed close relations with CCP general secretary Xi Jinping, becoming one of his closer advisors. In 2017, he was promoted to the 5th-ranked member of the Politburo Standing Committee and the first-ranking secretary of the CCP Secretariat. He has also chaired leading commissions on ideology and reforms and is believed to have instrumental in developing key concepts under Xi, including Xi Jinping Thought, Chinese-style modernization, the Chinese Dream and the Belt and Road Initiative. In 2022, he was succeeded by Cai Qi as the first secretary, and became the 4th-ranking member of the PSC. He became the CPPCC chairman in March 2023, succeeding Wang Yang.

Early life 
Born in Shanghai, Wang traces his heritage to Ye County, Shandong province. Wang's name, "Huning", literally means "Shanghai and Nanjing". Wang Huning's father was implicated during the anti–Peng Dehuai campaign by Mao and suffered persecution during the Cultural Revolution. During his youth, Wang went to the Shanghai Yongqiang School, where he obtained books that were forbidden during that era from his teachers. He graduated from high school in 1972, after which he became an apprentice worker for three years. He partly avoided the "down to the countryside" movement, spending some time in the rural areas.

Academic career
Wang was recommended to enter East China Normal University, then named Shanghai Normal University, in 1974 to study French. In 1977, he became a cadre of Shanghai Publishing Bureau and did research work at Shanghai Academy of Social Sciences. In 1978, he participated in the Gaokao, and was directly admitted as a postgraduate student in the Department of International Politics of Fudan University due to his excellent performance. He was trained by Wang Bangzuo, then director of the Political Science Teaching and Research Department of Fudan University, and Chen Qiren, obtaining a Master of Laws degree in 1981. In April 1984, he joined the CCP.

After graduation, Wang stayed at Fudan University as an instructor, associate professor, and professor from 1981 to 1989. During this time he published widely in academic journals, newspapers and magazines, which were read by the intellectual elite. He was named associate professor of International Politics at age 29 without first needing to serve as lecturer, becoming China's youngest associate professor at the time. Wang served as director of Fudan University's Department of International Politics from 1989 to 1994, and as dean of the law school in 1994–95.

In 1988, Wang was a visiting scholar in the United States for six months, spending the first three months at The University of Iowa, three weeks at the University of California, Berkeley, and visiting many other universities. During his time in the United States, Wang visited over 30 cities and close to 20 universities.

Wang was a well-known young scholar in academic circles since the 1980s. He wrote columns and essays for numerous party-sanctioned publications and was featured on the cover of current affairs magazines such as Banyuetan, attracting the attention of Shanghai's top political leaders. His achievements led to him participating in the drafting of theoretical documents for the CCP since the 13th CCP National Congress. In 1993, Wang led the Fudan student debate team to participate in a Chinese-language international college debate competition in Singapore. The team won the championship between 1988 and 1993, greatly enhancing Wang's reputation.

Political career
From 1995, Wang was referred to work for the party leadership in Beijing on recommendation from top Shanghai politicians Zeng Qinghong and Wu Bangguo, both of whom maintained close relationships with then-party General Secretary Jiang Zemin. Wang initially headed the political research team at the Central Policy Research Office (CPRO), and was promoted in April 1998 to deputy director of the CPRO, ultimately being promoted to director in 2002. He was regarded as one of the major sources of brainpower Jiang Zemin drew from and accompanied Jiang on foreign visits since 1998 as a special assistant. In 2002, he became a member of the CCP's Central Committee. In November 2007, Wang was admitted to the Secretariat of the Chinese Communist Party. He began accompanying General Secretary Hu Jintao on foreign trips and was considered one of Hu's three most influential advisors, along with Ling Jihua and Chen Shiju.

He was elected to the Politburo of the Chinese Communist Party in November 2012, becoming the first director of the CPRO to hold a seat on the elite ruling council. Following the ascension of Xi Jinping to the general secretary of the Chinese Communist Party in November 2012, Wang nurtured a close relationship with Xi, again emerging as one of the central members of Xi's entourage on international trips and seen to be one of Xi's closest advisors. Wang was chosen to be the 5th-ranking member of the Politburo Standing Committee, China's top decision-making body, on 25 October 2017, becoming one of the few members of the body without prior ministerial or provincial experience. He became the first secretary of the CCP Secretariat. Wang has frequently accompanied Xi in his trips, suggesting involvement in China's diplomacy.

In January 2020, Wang was appointed as deputy leader of the Central Leading Group for Responding to the COVID-19 Pandemic, with premier Li Keqiang as the leader. He also accompanied Xi to visiting Wuhan in March. He was succeeded by Jiang Jinquan as the director of CPRO in 2020. He played a key role in drafting the "third historical resolution" in November 2021, which further consolidated Xi's power. Reuters reported on 3 March 2023, citing sources, that Wang held a meeting in late October with top medical experts, senior officials and people from the propaganda apparatus, asking them how many deaths an abandonment of zero-COVID controls would cause in a worst-case scenario and requesting them to devise roadmaps on reopening policies in different paces.

Following the first plenary session of the 20th CCP Central Committee, Wang was reappointed to the Politburo Standing Committee of the Chinese Communist Party as its 4th ranking member, and was succeeded by Cai Qi as the first secretary of the Secretariat. On 17 January 2023, he was elected as a member of the National Committee of the CPPCC. Though initial reporting before the CCP Congress by the South China Morning Post suggested that he was going to become the chairman of the Standing Committee of the National People's Congress, he instead became the chairman of the Chinese People's Political Consultative Conference (CPPCC) in March 2023 due to his PSC ranking.

Nikkei Asia reported in January 2023 that Wang would become the deputy leader of the Central Leading Group for Taiwan Affairs, effectively making him one of the top people in charge with creating a policy in regards to Taiwan. It also reported that he would be tasked with laying the groundwork for unification with Taiwan, coming up with a theory that replaces "one country, two systems" to serve as a metric to measure progress toward China's unification goals and decide if a military operation is necessary. On 10 February, he met with Andrew Hsia, vice chairman of the Kuomintang. During the visit, Wang said that "Taiwan independence is incompatible with peace and runs counter to the well-being of Taiwan compatriots".

Political positions

Ideologies
Wang is thought to be behind the political thought published under the names of three CCP leaders: Three Represents of Jiang Zemin, the Scientific Outlook on Development of Hu Jintao, and Xi Jinping Thought. He is also believed to play a key role in drafting concepts including Chinese Dream, Chinese-style modernization, and the Belt and Road Initiative, concepts promoted by Xi.

System of government
During his tenure as a professor in the 1980s, Wang initially gained attention for his advocacy of neoconservativism , the view  that a centralized government is necessary to maintain economic growth and stability, which could later slowly do political reforms from within. In a paper published in 1986, he wrote that it is "very important to comply with the constitution" lest a new Cultural Revolution happen. His political views changed after his visit to the U.S., after which he advocated for a centralized one-party state that was culturally unified and self-confident to resist the influence of liberal ideas.

Culture
In his 1988 essay "The Structure of China's Changing Political Culture", Wang said that the CCP must reconsider how a nation's "software", meaning culture, values, and attitudes, shaped its "hardware", meaning economics, systems, and institutions. Some sources have attributed this type of thought to be "a daring break from the materialism of Orthodox Marxism." Wang said that China was under a great transformation, but the new model under the socialism with Chinese characteristics was leaving China with no core values, which "could serve only to dissolve societal and political cohesion". Wang also said that the introduction of Marxism to China was not completely positive, and that while the CCP criticized China's historical values since 1949, it has not paid enough attention to creating and shaping its own core values. He recommended that China combine its historical and modern values (including foreign Marxist values).

United States
In 1991, after his visit to the U.S., Wang wrote the book America Against America. The book talked about the increasing challenges he saw in the U.S., such as inequality, economic conflicts, decaying of social values and commodification. He also praised the strengths of the U.S., such as its modernity and was described by The Economist as "seeing the weaknesses in America's system, but not exaggerating them". In 2021, the book received renewed interest in the aftermath of the storming of the United States Capitol, with some used copies surging to 16,600 yuan ($2500) on antiques sites.

Personal life
Wang has been described by former colleagues as an insomniac and workaholic, introverted and discreet. After entering into politics in the 1990s, he cut off most contact with his academic colleagues. Having studied French in university, Wang is a fluent French speaker. He is also an avid reader of Wuxia novels. In his memoir Political Life, Wang said his goal in life was to keep writing books and teaching students.

Family
Wang's first marriage, to Zhou Qi, an international relations expert at Chinese Academy of Social Sciences, ended in divorce after he went to Zhongnanhai in 1996. They had no children. He later married a nurse in Zhongnanhai. They have one child.

Public perceptions
Having worked closely with three consecutive paramount leaders, Wang demonstrated a rare and remarkable ability to retain influence under leaders belonging to various Communist Party factions. Additionally, he has been described as "China's Kissinger" by The Hankyoreh, and is called guóshī by Chinese netizens, a title historically given to top religious leaders in Imperial China, particularly the Yuan Dynasty.

Works

Wang authored several books, including The Logic of Politics—The Principles of Marxist Political Science, America against America, General Introduction to New Politics, Analysis of Modern Western Politics, Analysis of Comparative Politics and Debate Contest in Lion City.

See also

Ideology of the Chinese Communist Party
Community of Common Destiny

References

1955 births
Living people
Chinese Communist Party politicians from Shanghai
Chinese diarists
Chinese political philosophers
Chinese political scientists
Chinese political writers
Delegates to the 19th National Congress of the Chinese Communist Party
Delegates to the 20th National Congress of the Chinese Communist Party
Delegates to the 11th National People's Congress
Delegates to the 12th National People's Congress
Delegates to the 13th National People's Congress
Delegates to the 14th National People's Congress
Fudan University alumni
Academic staff of Fudan University
Members of the 16th Central Committee of the Chinese Communist Party
Members of the 17th Central Committee of the Chinese Communist Party
Members of the 18th Politburo of the Chinese Communist Party
Members of the 19th Politburo Standing Committee of the Chinese Communist Party
Members of the 20th Politburo Standing Committee of the Chinese Communist Party
Members of the Secretariat of the Chinese Communist Party
People's Republic of China politicians from Shanghai
Writers from Shanghai